National Aluminium Company Limited (abbreviated as NALCO; incorporated in 1981) is a government company having integrated and diversified operations in mining, metal and power under the ownership of the Ministry of Mines, Government of India. Presently, the Government of India holds a 51.5% equity in NALCO.

It is one of the largest integrated bauxite–alumina–aluminium–power complex in the country, encompassing bauxite mining, alumina refining, aluminium smelting and casting, power generation, rail and port operations.

The company is the lowest-cost producer of metallurgical grade alumina in the world and lowest-cost producer of bauxite in the world as per a Wood McKenzie report. With sustained quality products, the company's export earnings accounted for about 42% of the sales turnover in the year 2018–19 and the company is rated as third-highest net export earning CPSE as per a Public Enterprise Survey report.

To face the challenges of an ever-evolving market and position the company in a sustainable growth path, a new corporate plan has been developed with well-defined three-year action plan, seven-year strategy and fifteen years vision of being a premier and integrated company in the aluminium value chain with strategic presence in mining both domestic and global, metals and energy sectors. The corporate plan has chalked out a roadmap for multifold growth in revenue and profit by 2032.

As a responsive corporate, the company is harnessing renewable energy aligning to the ambitious programmes of the Indian government. The company has already commissioned 198 MW wind power plants and further 50 MW wind power plants are in pipeline, making it the highest producer of renewable energy among PSUs.

Operations

NALCO is headquartered at Bhubaneswar, Odisha.

NALCO operates from two major Units 
 Mining and Refinery (M&R) complex 
Bauxite Mines located at Panchpatmali hills, Koraput with capacity of 7300,000 TPA
Alumina Refinery located at Damanjodi, Odisha with capacity of 2275,000 TPA
 Smelter and Power (S&P) complex  
Aluminium Smelter located at Angul, Odisha with capacity of 460,000 TPA
Captive Power Plant located at Angul, Odisha with capacity of 1200 MW
Port Facilities at Visakhapatnam and Paradip.
Wind Power Plants 
Gandikota, Andhra Pradesh – 50.4 MW (2.1MW, 24 nos. WEGs)
Ludarwa, Jaisalmer, Rajasthan – 47.6 MW (0.85 MW, 56 nos. WEGs)
Devikot, Jaisalmer, Rajasthan – 50 MW (2 MW, 25 nos. WEG)
Sangli, Maharashtra – 50.4 MW (2.1MW, 24 nos. WEGs)
Solar Power at Nalco Corporate Office, Bhubaneswar & NALCO Research & Technology Center, Bhubaneswar
 Regional offices at Kolkata, Mumbai, Delhi, Chennai & Bangalore 
10 operating stockyards at various locations in the Country

Products
Main products of NALCO are as follows

Aluminium Metal	
 Ingots	 
 Alloy Ingots	 
 T-Ingots	 
 Sows	 
 Billets	 
 Wire Rods	 
 Cast strips	

Alumina & Hydrate
 Calcined Alumina	  
 Alumina Hydrate	

Rolled Product
 Aluminium Rolled Products	 
 Aluminium Chequered Sheets	

Power
 Thermal Power	 
 Co-generation Power	 
 Wind Power	
 Solar Power

Employees 
As in June 2019, there were 6496 employees on the company's roll.

Expansions 

 To be more resilient to the vagaries of market, the company has prepared a New All-Weather Business Model. It has extensive plans for brownfield and greenfield expansion projects, which include the ongoing 5th Stream Refinery project of 1 MTPA capacity in existing Alumina Refinery at Damanjodi (Brownfield), development of Pottangi bauxite mines, Utkal D&E coal mines in Odisha, establishment 5 lakh TPA brownfield Smelters in Odisha.
 As part of backward integration, the company is establishing a caustic soda plant in JV with Gujarat Alkalies & Chemicals Limited (GACL) in Gujarat and a CT Pitch plant in JV with NINL in Odisha.
 The company has formed JV Company named ‘Angul Aluminium Park Private Ltd’ (AAPPL) with Odisha Industrial Infrastructure Development Corporation (IDCO) to give a boost to ancillary, upstream & downstream products related to aluminium industry.

Research & Development 

 NALCO Research & Technology Centre (NRTC) is located at Bhubaneswar, Odisha.
 NALCO in its pursuit towards organizational growth through sustained development in process, product and technology through research, development and innovation activity has set up a World class research center “NALCO Research & Technology Center (NRTC)” at Gothapatana, Bhubaneswar. This Research Center is equipped with all advance equipment like QEMSCAN (SEM-EDX), XRD, XRF, ICP-MS, Sedigraph, Laser Particle size analyser, UTM, DSC, TGA, ICP-OES, BET Analyzer, Potentiometer, OES, CHNS Analyzer, Metallurgical Microscope, Whiteness Index meter etc. The testing activities at NRTC has been started from 2019 on regular basis. R&D wing of NALCO Research and Technology Center has been recognized by DSIR, Government of India on 29.05.2020. Testing of outside samples on chargeable basis has been started and detail information is available at NALCO website (www.nalcoindia.com).
 The company pursues its R&D activities fervently and has already filed 36 patents out of which 17 patents have been granted and 5 have been commercialized until Dec 2018. As a part of its effort to convert waste to wealth, the company is endeavoring to salvage iron concentrate from red mud, Gallium from spent liquor. The company has also successfully commissioned a first of its kind de-fluoridation process based on nano-technology to de- contaminate the effluent water of Smelter solving a long-standing fluoride contamination problem of the area.

Mobile Apps 
NALCO has developed four mobile apps:

 Nisarg – Nalco Initiatives for Social Awareness and Responsible Growth
 Naginaa – Nalco Grahak Information and Networking App for All
 Namasya – Nalco Micro And Small enterprise Yogayog Application
 Hamesha Nalconian – App for the Retired employees of NALCO

CSR 

 The company, while climbing the ladder of success has strived hard to play a significant role in the socio-economic development in its operational areas through empathetic CSR activities. Rehabilitation of displaced families, employment, income generation, health care and sanitation of local people, education & skill development, providing safe drinking water, development of infrastructure, pollution control, environmental measures, rural development, promotion of arts, crafts & culture and various humanitarian good will missions have earned NALCO a place of pride in the corporate world and was awarded the SCOPE Meritorious Award for CSR from Hon’ble president of India in Apr’17.
For effective implementation of CSR activities, NALCO has set up a standalone Foundation in 2010.
It has spent Rs. 325 crore towards CSR activities until 2017–2018.
Notable efforts in field of Education includes Indradhanush scheme, where the company has sponsored 920 tribal children of Maoist infested Damanjodi sector and provided education to them in 3 reputed residential schools. 416 meritorious girl students of BPL families at Angul and Damanjodi sector have been adopted with financial support by the company under ‘Nalco ki Ladli’ scheme in line with Govt's ‘Beti Bachao, Beti Padhao’ Mission.
Recognizing the healthcare needs as one of the critical need, NALCO is operating 8 MHUs (Mobile Health Units) in peripheral villages of its plants by which more than one lakh patients are treated freely every year. Going a step ahead, the company is also setting a secondary modern eye care hospital at Angul and a Night Shelter in AIIMS, Bhubaneswar for attendants of indoor and OPD patients availing long-term treatment.
Responding to the call of Govt of India, NALCO actively participated in Swachh Bharat Abhiyan by constructing 479 toilets in various districts of its operating areas and has also taken up a noble initiative to make 11 periphery villages completely Open Defecation Free (ODF) in Damanjodi and Angul sector.
The company has taken the responsibility of Shri Jagannath Temple, Puri & its surrounding under PM's Iconic Shrine Development Programme to upgrade the infrastructure & maintain cleanliness with special emphasis on Renovation and beautification of Gandhi Park as a tourist spot, temple illumination, beautification of Puri town with thematic painting based on Jagannatha culture and battery-operated vehicle in railway station for differently-abled passengers and sick people.

 First Mines Safety Award-1988 by DGMS
 Best Eco-friendly Factory Award 1994–95 to the Mines and Refinery Complex by Odissa State Factory Inspectorate
 State Award-1995 to Captive Power Plant from state Factory inspectorate for Environment Management
 Indira Priyadarshini Vrikshamitra Award-1994 from MOEF, Govt. of India, for afforestation and wasteland development
 FICCI Environment Award for Environment Conservation and Pollution Control- 1996–97
 WEC-IIEE-IAEWP Environment award −1997 for contributing towards environment protection
 Gem Granite Environment Award for −1997-98 by FIMI, New Delhi for Mines
 Shri Sita Ram Rungta Memorial Social Awareness Award-1997-98 by FIMI, New Delhi
 Pollution Control Excellence Award – 1998 by Odisha State Pollution Control Board for Mines
 Special Commendation under Golden Peacock Environment Management Award 1998 Scheme by World Environment Foundation
 State Award for Best Occupational Health Centre to S&P Complex'-1998
 Best Safety Performance Award to CPP by CII (ER)- 1999–2000
 The prestigious Dun & Bradstreet's Best PSU Award – 2012 in Non-Ferrous Metal Category.
 Outstanding CSR Practices in Community Development – Odisha CSR Summit 2016

Right to Information Act 

Since NALCO is a public authority, it comes under the Right to Information Act. Thus, NALCO is required to provide information to various RTI queries asked by general public.

See also
 List of countries by aluminium production
 List of alumina refineries
 List of aluminium smelters

References

External links
 Official website 

Aluminium companies of India
Mining companies of India
Ministry of Mines (India)
Government-owned companies of India
Companies based in Bhubaneswar
Non-renewable resource companies established in 1981
1981 establishments in Orissa
Indian brands
Companies listed on the National Stock Exchange of India
Companies listed on the Bombay Stock Exchange